Malatya Massacre was anti-Alevi violence and murders that took place in Malatya, Turkey on April 17, 1978. After the murder of the mayor of the time, Hamit Fendoğlu, Sunni Islamist groups entered the Alevi and left-wing areas of the city and used violence.

Background 
According to the 1973 parliamentary general elections, the Republican People's Party (CHP) and the National Salvation Party (MSP) were the largest parties in Malatya. While the MSP, which was defined as Islamist, received the support of Sunni and right-wing sections, the CHP was generally supported by Alevi and left-wing groups. In this context, the separation of the right and left in the city began to increase, and left organizations began to be established and widespread, as well as right-wing associations such as Associations for Komünizmle Mücadele Dernekleri, Grey Wolves, Akıncılar Derneği. This polarization was also observed in the 1977 Turkish general elections, in which the MSP and the Nationalist Movement Party experienced a significant increase in votes.

During the period from 1968 to the massacre, incidents of unrest and violence such as the murder of Kemal Abbas Altunkaş in Malatya (1968), the Hekimhan Incident (1968), the 2 February Meeting (1975), the 15-16 February Incidents (1975) and the Akçadağ Teachers' School Incident (1975) happened.

Events

Murder of Hamit Fendoğlu 
The events started when the bomb in the package sent to the house of Hamid Fendoğlu, also known as Hamido, exploded and he, his daughter-in-law and 2 grandchildren died in this explosion. It was determined that the package was sent from Ankara on 7 April 1978. On the same date, 3 more bomb packages with a similar structure were sent to the post office, not only Fendoğlu, but also to Pazarcık, Kahramanmaraş CHP District Chief Memiş Özdal, Adıyaman Deputy Police Chief Abdülkadir Oltu and Adana businessperson Ahmet Akalın.

Although there is no consensus about who or by which organization the bomb was sent, the researchers announced that the bombs could only be produced in the Ankara Nuclear Research Center, according to the news published in the following days, and a search was carried out in this institution. Former President of the Grey Wolves, Muharrem Şemsek and several people working at the facility were detained, and the Nuclear Research Center was closed for a while. Şemsek and other detainees were later released. MHP officials denied it and claimed that the bomb was sent by right-wing groups and claimed that the bomb was sent by communist groups. The Ortadoğu newspaper falsely claimed that they had seized a tape stating that the assassination was "the work of leftists and separatists collaborating with them".

Attacks and destruction 
Shortly after Hamit Fendoğlu's murder, a group of about 100 people gathered in front of Fendoğlu's house. It has been reported that after being taken to the hospital, a group of about 1000 people gathered in front of the hospital marched to the city chanting slogans and started to engage in attacks.

One day after the assassination, on April 18, 1978, more than ten thousand people from the Bulgurlu/Izollu Tribe, to which Fendoğlu was affiliated, and the surrounding villages came to the city. The group, consisting mostly of young individuals, marched towards the neighborhoods where Alevis and leftists lived, with the slogans "Down with Communism, murderer Ecevit, Muslim Turkey, revenge on Dan Dan Hamido". The group, which also includes masked people, destroyed or destroyed the headquarters of political parties and democratic mass organizations such as CHP, TÖB-DER, TÜM-DER and the Tobacco Association, as well as the printing houses and administrative offices of Gayret, Görüs, Ekspres, Baydağı, Güneş Newspapers, monopoly and newsstands. set it on fire. Previously marked workplaces belonging to Leftists and Alevis were also destroyed.

On the same day, Tahir Kökçü, a student of İnönü University, who was among the attackers, was shot dead by an unknown killer. Malatya Public Prosecutor Necati Sezener and Captain Arif Doğan, the commander of the Gendarmerie Commando Unit from Adıyaman, were attacked and both were wounded with a knife and a bullet. Milliyet reported that “Religion is lost, bombs are being placed on mosques” announcements were made over municipal loudspeakers. In the following time, aggressive groups killed Naci Erguvanlı, Özcan Türksever and Sait Hazar, 14 to 15 years old high school students, by shooting them in the head.

In the following days, the attacks spread to the neighborhoods of Malatya and many people were injured. Meanwhile, the allegation that a large amount of poison was thrown into the main water reservoir of the city spread throughout the city in a short time. Thereupon, the Governor's Office announced that the city water should not be drunk and informed that the results of the analysis are expected to come. Some people applied to hospitals on suspicion of being poisoned. It has been reported that nearly 200 people applied to Doğu Private Hospital with the complaint of poisoning. However, the analyzes revealed that there was no poison in the water.

The attacks and destructions continued on the evening of 17 April until 20 April and were taken under control 3 days later. During the massacre, nearly 1000 workplaces, most of which belonged to leftists and Alevis, were destroyed and burned.

Conclusion 
Due to the destruction caused by the massacre, it was observed that the people affected by the massacre migrated from Malatya. In the following years, while the economically well-off individuals migrated to the provinces of Mersin, Adana, Istanbul and Izmir, the rest returned to their villages. Migrations have caused significant changes in Malatya's cultural, ethnic, religious and political structure.

Reactions 
Bülent Ecevit (Prime Minister): “It is said that the Malatya incident is not a coincidence and that the forces and organizations that want to fuel polarization in the country have a share. Opposition parties have not fully touched the events in Malatya because they take sides... There are those who do not agree to peace...”

Yaşar Okuyan (MHP Deputy Chairman): “Mayor of Malatya, who was brutally murdered by communist scoundrels, takes the real murderers of the late Fendoğlu, a valuable person of the cause, under the auspices of the CHP government. And he slanders the nationalists…”

Süleyman Demirel (AP Chairperson): “The government has not yet mentioned that there is communism, destructiveness and separatism under the incidents. This is the real reason that disturbs Turkey... How many more of our citizens will die for the government, which is incapable of understanding the real reason of these events, to wake up from its slumber of heedlessness? This government is in a sleep of heedlessness.

Alpaslan Türkeş (MHP Chairman): “I invite Ecevit and the Minister of Interior to prove their allegations about us, albeit implicitly. If they can't prove these claims, they will be the most despicable and dishonest people in the world..."

References 

Massacres in Turkey
Political violence in Turkey